Alexandros Panayi represented Cyprus in the Eurovision Song Contest 1995 with the song "Sti fotia". It finished 9th with 79 points.

Before Eurovision

National final 
The final was held on 14 March 1995 at the Monte Caputo Nightclub in Limassol, hosted by Yiorgos Theofanous and Evridiki. The winner was chosen by a 20-member jury.

At Eurovision

Voting

References 

1995
Countries in the Eurovision Song Contest 1995
Eurovision